Sargi is a 2017 Indian Punjabi language romantic drama film, directed by Neeru Bajwa and starring Jassi Gill, Rubina Bajwa and Babbal Rai. The film released worldwide on 24 February 2017. The film marked the directional debut of Neeru Bajwa and the acting debut of her sister, Rubina Bajwa.

Plot 

Sargi is a romantic love triangle involving Rubina Bajwa, Jassi Gill and Babbal Rai. The story starts in Punjab where Babbu (Jassi Gill) is shown to be in love with Sargi(Rubina bajwa) since childhood but never had the courage to express his feelings.
In order to provide a better living for her family, Sargi decides to do a sham marriage with Karamjit Anmol for immigration purposes and moves abroad with him. Unaware, Babbu was left heart broken. Sargi joins a restaurant run by B N Sharma, whose son kaim(Babbal Rai), falls in love with Sargi. When Babbu gets to know about Sargi's sham marriage, he also moves abroad and joins the same restaurant in quest to get his love. Now begins the game of one-upmanship among Jassi, Babbal and Karamjit. Jassi or Babbal, whom does Sargi choose forms the rest of the story.
The first half sets up the traditional form of romance with Babbu head over heels in love with Rubina but failing to express his feelings. This half is little slow but has a nice charm. After the Interval, there is a sense of deja-vu with kaim trying to woo Rubina and then the game of one-upmanship amongst the suitors of Sargi.

Cast
Rubina Bajwa (sargi)
Jassi Gill (babu)
 Babbal Rai (kaim)
Karamjit Anmol
B.N. Sharma (kaim's father)
Satwant Kaur
 Ginni Kapoor
 Parminder Gill
 Qulfi vines

Soundtrack

The soundtrack of Sargi was composed by B. Praak, Jassi Katyal & Gurmeet Singh while the lyrics were written by Veet Baljit & Jaani.

References

External links 
 
 Sargi official trailer

2017 films
Punjabi-language Indian films
2010s Punjabi-language films
2017 directorial debut films
Films scored by B Praak
Films scored by Jassi Katyal
Films scored by Gurmeet Singh